Baqerabad-e Rig (also Romanized as Bāqerābād-e Rīg; also known as Bākrābād, Bāqarābād, and Bāqerābād) is a village in Ekhtiarabad Rural District, in the Central District of Kerman County, Kerman Province, Iran. At the 2006 census, its population was 822, in 209 families.

References 

Populated places in Kerman County